Sheathing may refer to:

Engineering and technology
 Copper sheathing, on a wooden ship's hull to protect against fouling and shipworm
 Sheathing as electrical insulation on a wire or cable, see electrical cable
 Sheathing as protection against physical damage, see armoured cable
 Sheathing to reduce heat transfer, see pipe insulation

Construction
 Cladding (construction)
 Rigid panel
 Sheathing wrap or housewrap
 Siding (construction)

Other uses
 Sheathing, the action of putting a bladed weapon into a sheath or scabbard

See also 
 Cladding (disambiguation)
 Sheading, a historical division of the Isle of Man
 Sheath (disambiguation)